Joy-Slayd Mickels (born 29 March 1994) is a German professional footballer who plays as a forward or winger.

Career
In 2014, Mickels signed for FC Aarau in Switzerland after failing to make an appearance with German Bundesliga side Borussia Mönchengladbach. However, he was suspended for assault on two occasions in two different games there.

After playing in the Norwegian 1. divisjon for Strømmen IF he played for two fourth division clubs, Alemannia Aachen and SV Rödinghausen. In 2019 he signed for FC Wegberg-Beeck of the fifth-tier Mittelrheinliga.

References

External links
 

Living people
1994 births
People from Siegburg
Sportspeople from Cologne (region)
German footballers
Association football forwards
Regionalliga players
Swiss Super League players
Norwegian First Division players
FC Aarau players
Strømmen IF players
Alemannia Aachen players
SV Rödinghausen players
FC Wegberg-Beeck players
German expatriate footballers
Expatriate footballers in Switzerland
German expatriate sportspeople in Switzerland
Expatriate footballers in Norway
German expatriate sportspeople in Norway
Footballers from North Rhine-Westphalia